Panj may refer to:
 Panj, city in Tajikistan
 Panj (river), on the border of Tajikistan and Afghanistan
 Panj District, in Tajikistan
 Panj Free Economic Zone
 Panj, Iran, a village in Isfahan Province, Iran